The Progressive Party of the Cook Islands is a political party in the Cook Islands. It was established in October 2019 and is led by public servant Te Tuhi Kelly. It advocates public service reform and plans to contest the 2022 Cook Islands general election.

Party leader Kelly has posted statements sceptical of COVID-19 vaccines and vaccine mandates on the official party Facebook page.

The party won no seats in the 2022 election.

Electoral performance

Legislative Assembly

References

Political parties in the Cook Islands
Political parties established in 2019